Bjorn Anderson is an American independent film director.

Bjorn Anderson may also refer to:
Björn Andrésen (born 1955), Swedish actor and musician
Björn Andersson (born 1951), Swedish footballer
Björn Andersson (handballer) (born 1950), Swedish Olympic handballer
Björn Andersson (footballer, born 1982)

See also 
Bjørn Andersen (disambiguation), several people